Tameshkol Rural District is a rural district (dehestan) in Nashta District, Tonekabon County, Mazandaran Province, Iran. At the 2006 census, its population was 10,714, in 2,879 families. The rural district has 24 villages.

References 

Rural Districts of Mazandaran Province
Tonekabon County